You Seung-hun (also Yu Seong-hyeon, ; born June 28, 1983) is a South Korean former swimmer, who specialized in breaststroke events. He shared bronze medals with Sung Min, Jeong Doo-Hee, and Park Tae-Hwan in the 4 × 100 m medley relay (3:41.33) at the 2006 Asian Games in Doha, Qatar.

You qualified for the men's 100 m breaststroke at the 2004 Summer Olympics in Athens, by clearing a FINA B-standard entry time of 1:04.28 from the Dong-A Swimming Tournament in Seoul. He set a South Korean record and a personal best of 1:03.56 to lead the third heat by 0.28 of a second ahead of Chinese Taipei's Chen Cho-Yi. You failed to advance into the semifinals, as he placed thirty-first overall on the first day of preliminaries.

References

1983 births
Living people
Olympic swimmers of South Korea
Swimmers at the 2004 Summer Olympics
Swimmers at the 2006 Asian Games
Asian Games medalists in swimming
South Korean male breaststroke swimmers
Asian Games bronze medalists for South Korea
Medalists at the 2006 Asian Games
21st-century South Korean people